The Edward VIII Plateau is a dome-shaped, ice-covered peninsula between Magnet Bay and Edward VIII Bay in Antarctica. It was probably seen by personnel on the RSS William Scoresby in 1936, and mapped from aerial photos taken by the Lars Christensen Expedition, 1936-37, and named Gulfplataet (the gulf plateau). It was renamed "King Edward Plateau" by ANCA, but the form Edward VIII Plateau has been approved by the Advisory Committee on Antarctic Names (US-ACAN) to be consistent with the names of nearby Edward VIII Bay and Ice Shelf.

See also
Styles Bluff

References

Plateaus of Antarctica